Frank William Handlen (born September 26, 1916) is an American painter, sculpture and shipwright, known for his marine-based portraits.

Biography 

Born in Brooklyn in 1916, and raised in Caldwell, New Jersey, Handlen depicts ships, the sea and the Maine landscape in oil and pastels. In 1938, his mentor, marine artist Frederick Judd Waugh, encouraged him to go to Maine, "where it will all be before you". Handlen settled first in Biddeford Pool and later in Kennebunkport. As a young man, he worked in Bernie Warner's shipyard on the Kennebunk River and eventually designed and built his own forty-foot, sixteen ton topsail schooner, The Saltwind, which is moored in the Kennebunk River behind his house, very near the site of the old shipyard. In 1994, he was commissioned to create the heroic bronze statue, Our Forebears of the Coast, which stands on the Kennebunkport River Green.

Handlen was a Fellow of The American Society of Marine Artists for 22 years. He illustrated "Seapiece The Story of a Maine Boy" by Will Beale and "The Story of Maine for Young Readers" by Melville Freeman and Estelle Hale Perry. His pastels, oil paintings and pen and ink drawings are extensively owned by private and corporate collectors including The Kennebunkport Historical Society, The Brick Store Museum, MBNA, Sears Roebuck and The St. Botolph Club in Boston. He turned 100 in September 2016, and 105 in 2021.

References

External links 

1916 births
Living people
20th-century American male artists
20th-century American painters
American centenarians
American male painters
American marine artists
Men centenarians
People from Brooklyn
People from Caldwell, New Jersey